PROGETTAPS is the Spanish abbreviation for the Generation and Transfer of Agricultural Technology and Seed Production. A program for agricultural development for Guatemala, it was developed and administered by the International Fund for Agricultural Development and funded by the Inter-American Development Bank. Operating from 1986 to 1993, it cost about $25 million. 

The general idea was to foster research and extension linkages between Guatemalan research institutes and rural farmers, and who could benefit from improved seed varieties by higher yielding varieties.

Success appears to have been mixed. Some connections were made between the research institutions, and with some farmers benefiting. However, the program depended on external funding.

Agriculture in Guatemala
International Fund for Agricultural Development
1986 in Guatemala